Awad Ahmed Ashareh is a Somali politician. He is the Chairman of the federal Information, Public Awareness, Culture and Heritage Committee of Somalia.

References

Ethnic Somali people
Living people
Somalian politicians
Year of birth missing (living people)